Jade Le Guilly (born 18 June 2002) is a French professional footballer who plays as a left-back for Liga F club Real Sociedad, on loan from Division 1 Féminine club Paris Saint-Germain.

Club career
Le Guilly is a youth academy graduate of Paris Saint-Germain. She joined the club in 2014 at the age of 12. She made her professional debut for the club on 10 December 2020 in a 2–0 Champions League win against Górnik Łęczna. On 8 February 2021, she signed her first professional contract with the club until June 2024.

On 6 September 2022, Le Guilly joined Spanish club Real Sociedad on a season long loan deal.

International career
Le Guilly is a French youth international. She was a member of French squad at the 2022 FIFA U-20 Women's World Cup.

Career statistics

Honours
Paris Saint-Germain
 Division 1 Féminine: 2020–21

References

External links
 
 

2002 births
Living people
Sportspeople from Val-de-Marne
Women's association football defenders
French women's footballers
France women's youth international footballers
Paris Saint-Germain Féminine players
Real Sociedad (women) players
Division 1 Féminine players
French expatriate women's footballers
French expatriate sportspeople in Spain
Expatriate women's footballers in Spain